Senator Romer may refer to:

Chris Romer (born 1959), Colorado State Senate
Roy Romer (born 1928), Colorado State Senate

See also
Senator Romero (disambiguation)